A by-election was held in the UK Parliament constituency of West Tyrone on 3 May 2018, following the resignation of Barry McElduff, who had been the Member of Parliament (MP) since 2017. McElduff had become embroiled in a social media controversy which had resulted in his suspension from Sinn Féin on 8 January. He announced his resignation on 15 January 2018.

This was the first by-election held during the 57th UK Parliament, which was elected in the 2017 general election. It was the first Parliamentary by-election held in Northern Ireland since the Mid Ulster by-election in 2013. Sinn Féin candidate Órfhlaith Begley held the seat with a slightly reduced majority, compared to the June 2017 snap election.

Background

On 5 January 2018, sitting MP Barry McElduff tweeted a video of himself in a shop with a loaf of Kingsmill bread on his head, asking where the shop kept its bread. As it coincided with the 42nd anniversary of the Kingsmill massacre—where republicans murdered ten Protestant civilians—unionists accused him of mocking the massacre and the video was widely criticised, including by nationalists. Democratic Unionist Party (DUP) leader Arlene Foster said "mocking is depraved" and called the video "inhuman". McElduff deleted it and apologised, saying he was not alluding to the massacre and offering to meet the victims' families. On 8 January, Sinn Féin apologised for McElduff's actions, condemned the video, and suspended him from Sinn Féin for three months. McElduff announced on 15 January that he was resigning his seat. He was appointed the Steward and Bailiff of the Three Hundreds of Chiltern on 16 January 2018, a mechanism by which an MP's resignation is formalised.

The constituency of West Tyrone was created for the 1997 election and has been held by Sinn Féin since 2001. The seat is overwhelmingly nationalist, with nationalist parties consistently winning over 50% of the vote since the seat was created. Despite this, the nationalist vote has traditionally been split between the Social Democratic and Labour Party (SDLP) and Sinn Féin, whilst the unionist parties have been more willing to make pacts to increase their chances of victory.

Ordinarily, the writ of election for a vacant seat is moved by the party of the outgoing MP, but as Sinn Féin do not take their seats in the House of Commons they were unable to do so. In their absence, the writ was instead moved by the Government Chief Whip, Julian Smith. On 28 March, the writ of election was passed by the House of Commons. The election was scheduled for 3 May, coinciding with the scheduled local elections in England.

Unity candidate
After the election was called, these was discussion about the possibility of a non-partisan victims' candidate standing against Sinn Féin. As Sinn Féin won a majority of the vote at the last election, a unity candidate would be unlikely to win without support across both the nationalist and unionist communities. Potential candidates included Kevin Skelton and Sharon Gault, both of whom lost relatives in terrorist attacks during the Troubles. Ulster Unionist Party leader Robin Swann endorsed the proposal, calling for a "non-partisan candidate who will be a voice for victims to contest this seat against Sinn Féin".

Local Democratic Unionist Party MLA Tom Buchanan suggested that a cross-community candidate was unlikely, given that his party had not been approached about standing down. Further criticism of the idea was levelled by Alan McBride – a relative of two Shankill Road bombing victims – describing the idea of an agreed victims' candidate as "potentially toxic".

By late March the chances of a unity candidate being nominated were described as 'remote'. Kevin Skelton – who had earlier expressed his willingness to stand as a unity candidate – noted that he had not been approached by any party to stand. The Ulster Unionists, who had originally called for a non-partisan candidate, were understood to have unsuccessfully approached a different person to ask them to be a 'victims candidate'. Omagh bomb campaigner Michael Gallagher also voiced his disappointment, and acknowledged that there had not been a positive response to the idea. Ultimately, no unity candidate was nominated and each of Northern Ireland's major parties fielded a candidate instead.

Candidates and result
Nominations to stand in the by-election closed on 10 April 2018.

 

26-year-old local solicitor Órfhlaith Begley was selected as the Sinn Féin candidate at a party convention on 25 February. She is the daughter of Seán Begley, a long-serving Sinn Féin councillor on Omagh District Council.

The DUP announced local MLA Thomas Buchanan was announced as the party's candidate on 9 April. He had previously contested the seat in the 2017 general election.

The SDLP were understood to be preparing to contest the by-election. Former candidate and local MLA Daniel McCrossan released a statement in March condemning the fact that two months had passed from McElduff's resignation without a by-election date being fixed. McCrossan stated in early April that the selection process for the by-election was underway. He was announced as the SDLP candidate on 9 April.

Ulster Unionist Party leader Robin Swann repeatedly expressed a preference for a unity candidate instead of a candidate from his own party. Despite this, it was acknowledged that the party would have to explore "other options" in the event that such a candidate was not agreed upon. They nominated Omagh councillor Chris Smyth as their candidate. He accepted the nomination with "mixed emotions", expressing disappointment at the lack of a non-partisan and cross-community candidate.

The Alliance Party declined to support a 'victims candidate', with party leader Naomi Long giving her reasons to victims campaigner Kevin Skelton in a letter. Stephen Donnelly was subsequently announced as the Alliance candidate at the party conference on 24 March.

Cannabis legalisation campaigner Barry Brown had initially announced his intention to contest the by-election as the Citizens Independent Social Thought Alliance (CISTA) candidate, having previously stood in the 2015 and 2017 elections. He later decided not to stand, citing commitments by the SDLP and Alliance Party towards legalising medicinal cannabis.

Campaign 
Early in the campaign Sinn Féin candidate Órfhlaith Begley raised concerns at the proposed changes to the Parliamentary and Assembly constituencies that formed part of the sixth periodic boundary review. In particular, she expressed her opposition to the proposed division of the town of Dungiven, which was to be split between the constituencies of West Tyrone, Mid Ulster and a newly created Causeway constituency. She argued that the new boundaries "blatantly advantages the DUP at the expense of the nationalist electorate." Sinn Féin furthermore claimed that a campaign of voter suppression had been taking place, and urged local residents to confirm their eligibility to vote.

In mid-April an SDLP party worker claimed to have been verbally abused and attacked whilst putting up election posters in the constituency. According to the police report, the three men who assaulted the SDLP worker yelled sectarian abuse and threw his poster and ladder into the River Strule. Sinn Féin also claimed to have had posters stolen and destroyed in Omagh town centre. SDLP candidate Daniel McCrossan described the incidents as "an attack on democracy".

Previous result
Outgoing MP Barry McElduff was elected at the General Election in 2017, following the retirement of fellow Sinn Féin politician Pat Doherty. Sinn Féin won an absolute majority of the vote, their best ever result in the constituency. McElduff had previously served as an MLA for the equivalent constituency in the Northern Ireland Assembly since 1998.

References

2018 elections in the United Kingdom
2018 elections in Northern Ireland
By-elections to the Parliament of the United Kingdom in County Tyrone constituencies
May 2018 events in the United Kingdom
21st century in County Tyrone